Varallo Sesia railway station is the train station serving the comune of Varallo Sesia, in the Piedmont region, northwestern Italy. It is the junction terminus of the Novara–Varallo.

The station is currently managed by Rete Ferroviaria Italiana (RFI). However, the passenger building is managed by comune. The station is served only by historic trains, in the service of tourism, in planned dates. The service ordinary passengers has been suspended from 15 September 2014, by decision of the Piedmont Region. Train services are operated by Fondazione FS and Trenitalia. Each of these companies is a subsidiary of Ferrovie dello Stato (FS), Italy's state-owned rail company.

History
The station was opened on 12 April 1886, upon the inauguration the fourth-last part of the Novara–Varallo railway, from Borgosesia to Varallo Sesia.

Features
Two tracks of which are equipped with platforms.

Train services
The station is served by the following services:

Historic train (Treno storico) Novara - Varallo Sesia

See also

 History of rail transport in Italy
 List of railway stations in Piedmont
 Rail transport in Italy
 Railway stations in Italy

References

External links

Varallo Sesia
Railway stations in Piedmont
Railway stations opened in 1886